Rhiannon is a queen in Welsh mythology.

Rhiannon may also refer to:
 Rhiannon (given name), a Welsh given name
 Rhiannon (song), a 1975 Fleetwood Mac song
 Rhiannon: Curse of the Four Branches, a 2008 video adventure game
 The Song of Rhiannon, a 1972 fantasy novel by Evangeline Walton
 The Sword of Rhiannon, a 1942 science fiction novel by Leigh Brackett
 Rhiannon's Ride, a 2004–06 series of novels written by Kate Forsyth
 16912 Rhiannon, an asteroid discovered in 1998

See also
 Rhianna, variant feminine given name